First hundred days (alternatively written first 100 days) often refers to the beginning of a leading politician's term in office, and may refer to:

 First 100 days of Franklin D. Roosevelt's presidency
 First 100 days of Barack Obama's presidency
 First 100 days of Gustavo Petro's presidency
 First 100 days of Donald Trump's presidency
 First 100 days of Joe Biden's presidency
 First 100 days of Imran Khan's prime ministership

Other uses
 UKIP: The First 100 Days, a 2015 British mockumentary
 The Story with Martha MacCallum, an American cable news show which premiered as The First 100 Days

See also
 Hundred Days (disambiguation)